Timothy I may refer to:

 Pope Timothy I of Alexandria, Pope of Alexandria & Patriarch of the See of St. Mark in 378–384
 Timothy I of Constantinople, Patriarch of Constantinople in 511–518
 Timothy I (Nestorian patriarch), Catholicus-Patriarch of the East in 780–823
 Timotheus I of Jerusalem, patriarch in 1935–1955
 The First Epistle to Timothy